Adrian Bernard Caldwell (born July 4, 1966) is a retired American professional basketball player, who had a career in the National Basketball Association (NBA) from 1989 to 1997.

An undersized center (2.05 m), Caldwell attended Southern Methodist University and Lamar University, both in Texas.

Undrafted in 1989, he then played professionally for five NBA teams including the Houston Rockets, Indiana Pacers, New Jersey Nets, Philadelphia 76ers, and Dallas Mavericks.

References

External links
NBA stats @ basketballreference.com

1966 births
Living people
American expatriate basketball people in Argentina
American expatriate basketball people in Italy
American expatriate basketball people in Spain
American expatriate basketball people in Venezuela
American men's basketball players
Atenas basketball players
Basketball players from Texas
CB Valladolid players
Centers (basketball)
Dallas Mavericks players
Houston Rockets players
Indiana Pacers players
La Crosse Bobcats players
Lamar Cardinals basketball players
Liga ACB players
New Jersey Nets players
Olimpia Basket Pistoia players
Pallacanestro Cantù players
People from Falls County, Texas
Philadelphia 76ers players
Sioux Falls Skyforce (CBA) players
SMU Mustangs men's basketball players
Undrafted National Basketball Association players